Mercedes-Benz USA, LLC (MBUSA)  is a Mercedes-Benz Group-owned distributor for passenger cars in the United States, headquartered in Sandy Springs, Georgia (Atlanta, Georgia). that sells cars from the Mercedes-Benz brand.

Mercedes-Benz USA was founded in 1965 to integrate sales in the most important foreign market into the Group. Previously, the distribution was taken over by partners. 

MBUSA employs about 1400 people and has been awarded several times by Fortune as a top employer. In July 2015, MBUSA's headquarters were relocated from Montvale, New Jersey to Sandy Springs, Georgia. This was to move about 1000 employees to the region and create new jobs to the northern suburb of Atlanta.

Mercedes-Benz USA was the name sponsor of Louisiana Superdome from 2011 to 2021. In 2015, the company also acquired the naming rights to the Mercedes-Benz Stadium, home to the NFL franchise Atlanta Falcons, and MLS franchise Atlanta United FC.

References

External links 
 

Mercedes-Benz
 
American subsidiaries of foreign companies
Car manufacturers of the United States
Companies based in Sandy Springs, Georgia
American companies established in 1965
1965 establishments in New Jersey
Vehicle manufacturing companies established in 1965